The New York City Harbor Strike of 1919 started on January 9, 1919. It involved 15,000–16,000 workers striking after it was called by the executive committee of the Marine Workers Union.

It stopped temporarily on January 13, after President Wilson requested intervention by the War Labor Board on January 11 through a telegram. After the War Labor Board's involvement was announced, the strike was suspended on January 13.

Deliberations occurred over the next 3 weeks, a ruling was decided a month later through the case, Marine Workers’ Affiliation of New York Harbor, v. The Railroad Administration, Shipping Board, United States Navy, War Department, and Red Star Towing & Transportation Co. It was ruled on by War Labor Board Umpire, V. Everit Macy.

The specifics of the awards was divided by sectors within the industry:

 Ferryboats;
 Tugs, other towing vessels, and steam lighters
 Lighters, covered barges, and hoisters;
 Coal and grain boats, scows, and dumps.

The general findings however were as follows.

For applicable sectors, hours would be reduced. Everit cites the World War I armistice, lowering the need for long working hours. For sectors where hours were lowered, their previous pay within a month, established in 1918, would remain unchanged, effectively raising hourly pay. For all sectors, total pay for a 'normal working day' would remain unchanged. Hours worked past what was ruled a normal working day by the war board would be paid as 1.5x overtime pay. This, effective May 1, 1919 would remain in effect until peace was declared (the board was disbanded on May 31, 1919) or July 1, 1919 

"I therefore find that no wage increase should be granted and that the wage scales
in the award of the New York Harbor Board dated July 12, 1918, and those in the
award of the Railroad Administration Board dated September 1, 1918,  shall remain
in effect during the life of this award. That those employees whose working day is
herein reduced from 12 hours to 8 hours shall receive the same monthly wage for the
8 hours as they formerly did for 12 hours.  Also that the employees whose week has
been reduced to 48 hours shall receive the same monthly salary as previously."
- Umpire, V. Everit (2/25/1919)

However, The Marine Workers Union refused these terms and re-declared a strike on March 4, 1919. A notable exception to the strike occurred two days later, when workers returned to help dock & greet returning soldiers from World War 1.

By March 24, the four main government agencies involved (The Railroad Administration, Shipping Board, United States Navy & War Department) had conceded to strikers demands for higher wages, against the legally binding War Board decision. The Railroad Administration was the first to grant the eight hour day with wage increases, after which the three other administrations followed, ending the strike for the public sector.

However, the strike continued for private boats.  A preliminary deal was reached for the remaining 4,000-5,000 striking workers on April 20, 1919. Which was then followed by two months of deliberation by the Arbitration Board, with an agreement reached on June 16, 1919.

References 

Labor
United States
1919 labor disputes and strikes